Pooja Gauthami Umashankar, mononymously known as Pooja, is a Sri Lankan actress, who has primarily appeared in Tamil, Sinhala and Malayalam language films.

Early and personal life
Pooja's mother, Sandhya and her father, H. R. Umashankar. Umashankar was at Valparai, working with Hindustan Unilever Limited, as a manager. Pooja can speak Kannada, Sinhala, Tamil, and English. After she did her pre-schooling in Sri Lanka, she came to India and went to Poornapragnya in Aldur, Chikmagalur and then to Nirmala Convent in Mysuru. Later she continued her education at Baldwin's Girls High school in Bengaluru and did graduation (B.Com.) and Post Graduation (MBA) at   Mount Carmel College, Bangalore.

In December 2016, she married Prashan David Vethakan, who is a Sri Lankan businessman.

Career
Pooja was introduced by a friend of her to cinematographer-turned-director Jeeva, who signed her for the role of Anglo-Indian girl in his Tamil venture Ullam Ketkumae. Pooja said that at that time she planned to finish that film and return to her original job and did not take an acting career into consideration. She stated: "I said to myself I'd act in just this film, see what it's like, make good use of the money and get back to studying". She was soon offered a role opposite R. Madhavan, which she could not decline and made her rethink her decision. Ullam Ketkumae'''s massive delay meant that her second film, the romantic comedy Jay Jay (2004), directed by Saran, became her first official release. Pooja received favorable reviews for her performance in Jay Jay; G. Ulaganathan from Deccan Herald wrote: "Spirited, lively, Pooja's sparkling eyes and smile do leave an impression". She next played the romantic interest of Ajith Kumar in another Saran film, Attahasam, which, in spite of mixed critical response, went on to become a financial success. Pooja, too, met with criticism, with critics citing that she had "only limited role" and was "wasted [...] in an insignificant and half-baked role". Pooja's subsequent release happened to be Ullam Ketkumae that featured her in one of the five leading roles alongside Shaam, Laila, Arya and Asin. The film fetched positive remarks and emerged as a sleeper hit. She went to appear in commercial Tamil films such as Thambi and Pori. In 2007, Pooja also appeared in a Malayalam film, Panthaya Kozhi, before landing the lead female role in Bala's Naan Kadavul. Her portrayal of Hamshavalli, a blind beggar, was critically appreciated and earned her several accolades, including the Filmfare Award for Best Actress – Tamil and Tamil Nadu State Film Award for Best Female Character Artiste. Following Naan Kadavul, Pooja went on a sabbatical, appeared just in cameo roles in TN-07 AL 4777, Drohi and the Telugu film Orange.

Her big budget film Kusa Pabha released in early 2012 and became the highest grosser ever in the history of Sri Lankan film industry. Critics praised Pooja for her role of Pabawathi.

Television
She was one of the judges in the reality dance show Aatam Paatam Kondatam'' Kalaignar TV, Sun TV.

Filmography

Television

Awards

References

External links

 
 

Living people
Sinhalese actresses
21st-century Indian actresses
Indian film actresses
Actresses in Malayalam cinema
Sri Lankan film actresses
Actresses from Karnataka
Filmfare Awards South winners
Tamil Nadu State Film Awards winners
Sri Lankan people of Indian descent
Actresses in Tamil cinema
21st-century Sri Lankan actresses
Kannada actresses
People from Chikkamagaluru district
Actresses in Telugu cinema
Year of birth missing (living people)